Cary DeVall Langhorne (May 14, 1873 – April 25, 1948) was a Commander in the United States Navy and a Medal of Honor recipient for his role in the United States occupation of Veracruz.

He graduated from the Virginia Military Institute in 1894, and from the University of Virginia in 1896.

He would have built (1916–1917) St. Brides Farm in Upperville, VA for himself using noted Oval Office architect, Nathan C. Wyeth. He died April 25, 1948 at St. Brides and is buried in Arlington National Cemetery, Arlington, Virginia. His grave can be found in section 11, grave 868.

Medal of Honor citation
Rank and organization: Surgeon, U.S. Navy. Born: 14 May 1873, Lynchburg, Va. Accredited to: Virginia. G.O. No.: 177, 4 December 1915.

Citation:

For extraordinary heroism in battle, engagement of Vera Cruz, 22 April 1914. Surg. Langhorne carried a wounded man from the front of the Naval Academy while under heavy fire.

See also

 List of Medal of Honor recipients (Veracruz)

References

External links
 

1873 births
1948 deaths
United States Navy Medal of Honor recipients
United States Navy officers
Burials at Arlington National Cemetery
People from Lynchburg, Virginia
Battle of Veracruz (1914) recipients of the Medal of Honor
Virginia Military Institute alumni